Asghar Khanlu (also Romanized as ‘Asghar Khānlū; also known as ‘Asgar Khānlū) is a village in Angut-e Sharqi Rural District, Anguti District, Germi County, Ardabil Province, Iran. At the 2006 census, its population was 201, in 44 families.

References 

Towns and villages in Germi County